List of A roads in zone 9 in Great Britain starting north of the A8, east of the A9 (roads beginning with 9).

Single- and double-digit roads

Triple-digit roads

Four-digit roads

See also
 B roads in Zone 9 of the Great Britain numbering scheme
 List of motorways in the United Kingdom
 Transport in Aberdeen#Roads
 Transport in Edinburgh#Road network
 Transport in Scotland#Road

References 

 
9